Darrick David Martin (born March 6, 1971) is an American basketball coach, most recently head coach for the Reno Bighorns of the NBA G League. He played basketball for more than a decade, shuttling between the Continental Basketball Association (CBA), where he won the 2003 CBA Playoffs MVP, and the NBA. In 2003, he even played for the Harlem Globetrotters. He then went on to play for the Los Angeles Lightning of the Independent Basketball Association (IBL). He was named the head coach of Reno in June 2016.

High school honors and collegiate history
As a senior at St. Anthony High School, Martin was a Parade First-Team All-American and named to the McDonald's High School All-American team.

Martin received a full scholarship from UCLA and played on a Bruins squad with future NBA players Don MacLean, Tracy Murray and Mitchell Butler. As a quick point guard, he completed his college career at UCLA in 1992 ranked second in school history in both assists (636) and steals (179) behind Jerome "Pooh" Richardson. His career assists total placed him fourth on the Pacific-10 Conference's all-time list. Darrick averaged 9.3 points and 4.9 assists in his four years at UCLA. As a junior, he averaged a career-high 11.6 points and 6.8 assists, and his assists average was the best in the Pac-10 and the 16th highest in the country. His single-season high of 217 assists was second all-time at UCLA to Jerome "Pooh" Richardson's 236.

Professional career

Pre-NBA career
The 5'11" point guard was not drafted by an NBA franchise and instead played for the CBA's Sioux Falls Skyforce, (where he was the league's 10th leading scorer with 21 points per game). He was selected to the CBA All-League Second Team in 1995. He signed two consecutive 10-day contracts with the NBA's Minnesota Timberwolves in February 1995. He returned to the Timberwolves for the 2003–04 NBA season as a backup for Sam Cassell after Troy Hudson was injured.

Vancouver Grizzlies
At the beginning of the 1995–96 NBA season he signed with the Vancouver Grizzlies as a free agent, but the Grizzlies traded him back to the Timberwolves two months later, in exchange for a second-round draft pick. His scoring average in these first two seasons remained at about seven points per game.

Los Angeles Clippers
Martin signed with the Los Angeles Clippers in 1996 and remained with them for three seasons, averaging ten points per game in (and playing all 82 games of) the first two of them.

He returned to the Clippers in the 2004–05 season and averaged 3.8 PPG.

Sacramento Kings
Martin's contract expired once again after the lockout-shortened 1999 season, and he signed with Sacramento Kings where he would spend the next two years. Late in the Kings' 130–109 win over the Dallas Mavericks on March 6, 2000, Martin came off the bench to score 11 points in only two minutes. He was given the nickname "The Domino" by his teammates.

Toronto Raptors
Martin signed with the Toronto Raptors for the 2005–06 season. In his first year with the club he posted 2.6 ppg and 1.4 apg in 8.5 mpg of play. Martin's primary role with the Raptors, according to head coach Sam Mitchell, was to provide guidance to the younger players on the team such as point guards T. J. Ford and José Calderón.
Darrick's most notable moment in a Raptors uniform was a 3-pointer against the Dallas Mavericks on November 29, 2006. With over a second remaining in regulation, and the Raptors trailing by 22 points, Martin hoisted up a 3-point shot uncontested and successfully sunk the shot.  With the Raptors NBA record consecutive game streak with a 3-pointer on the verge of ending, Martin's shot enabled the Raptors to extend the streak which ended January 24, 2011. After two and a half seasons with Toronto, Martin was waived on March 27, 2008, to open up a spot on the roster for Linton Johnson.  Though waived by the Raptors, Martin stayed with the team as an informal assistant coach/consultant. Although voted the greatest Raptor of all time, bandwagons fail to acknowledge the importance of Darrick for the Raptors, and his mentorship of the younger players in the team.

Later work
In November 2009, Martin returned to his first NBA team, the Minnesota Timberwolves, as the assistant director of player development.

In 2012, Martin was named an assistant coach of the St. John's Red Storm men's basketball team, working under head coach Steve Lavin.

On October 27, 2015 it was announced that he had been hired as the radio analyst for the UCLA Bruins on the UCLA Bruins IMG Sports network, replacing Tracy Murray.

On June 22, 2016, Martin was named the head coach of the Reno Bighorns of the NBA Development League. When the team relocated to become the Stockton Kings, he was not retained.

References

External links

 

1971 births
Living people
African-American basketball players
American expatriate basketball people in Canada
American expatriate basketball people in Russia
American men's basketball players
Basketball coaches from Colorado
Basketball players from Denver
BC Avtodor Saratov players
Dallas Mavericks players
Harlem Globetrotters players
Los Angeles Clippers players
McDonald's High School All-Americans
Minnesota Timberwolves players
Parade High School All-Americans (boys' basketball)
Point guards
Reno Bighorns coaches
Sacramento Kings players
Sioux Falls Skyforce (CBA) players
Sportspeople from Denver
Toronto Raptors players
UCLA Bruins men's basketball players
Undrafted National Basketball Association players
Vancouver Grizzlies players
Yakima Sun Kings players
21st-century African-American sportspeople
20th-century African-American sportspeople